The 1970–71 La Liga was the 40th season since its establishment. The season started on September 12, 1970, and finished on April 18, 1971. Valencia won its fourth title.

Team locations

League table

Results table

Pichichi Trophy

References 
 Spanish Final Table 1970-71
 Primera División 1970/71

External links 
  Official LFP Site

1970 1971
1970–71 in Spanish football leagues
Spain